Marionfyfea carnleyi is a species of land planarian from Sub-Antarctic Islands of New Zealand.

Description
Marionfyfea carnleyi measures about 1 to 2 cm in length. The dorsum is cream and has two broad dark brown lateral stripes, while the venter is uniformly cream. The eyes are arranged in a single row around the body margin, being more concentrated at the anterior end. The pharynx is long and tubular.

References

Geoplanidae
Worms of New Zealand
Fauna of the Campbell Islands
Fauna of the Auckland Islands